The 1957–58 Copa México was the 41st edition of the Copa México and the 15th staging in the professional era.

The competition started on March 2, 1958, and concluded on April 15, 1958, with the replay of the Final, held at the Estadio Olímpico de la Ciudad de los Deportes in Mexico City, in which León defeated Zacatepec 5–2.

Preliminary round

|}

Final round

References

Copa MX
1957–58 in Mexican football
1958 domestic association football cups